Bozhughar (also Romanized as Bozhūghar; also known as Bozhdāghar and Bozdeghar) is a village in Dastgerdan Rural District, Dastgerdan District, Tabas County, South Khorasan Province, Iran. At the 2006 census, its population was 91, in 27 families.

References 

Populated places in Tabas County